Toni Donhauser  (13 March 1921 - 12 December 1990) is a German politician, representative of the Christian Social Union of Bavaria. He was a member of the Landtag of Bavaria between 1974 and 1982.

See also
List of Bavarian Christian Social Union politicians

Christian Social Union in Bavaria politicians
1921 births
1990 deaths